Emi Moronuki (born 22 October 1992) is a Japanese swimmer. She competed in the women's 50 metre backstroke event at the 2018 FINA World Swimming Championships (25 m), in Hangzhou, China.

References

External links
 

1992 births
Living people
Japanese female backstroke swimmers
Place of birth missing (living people)
20th-century Japanese women
21st-century Japanese women